Movement for National Renewal may refer to a number of political parties:

Movement for National Renewal (Gabon)
Telem (political party)